Jules Munshin (February 22, 1915 – February 19, 1970) was an American actor, comedian and singer who had made his name on Broadway when he starred in Call Me Mister. His additional Broadway credits include The Gay Life and Barefoot in the Park. On screen, he is best remembered for On the Town, in which he co-starred with Frank Sinatra and Gene Kelly as sailors on leave in New York City.

Early life
Munshin was born in New York City and began in show business shortly after graduating from high school. He worked in Catskill resorts, then vaudeville and was a singer for the George Olsen band. While serving in the U.S. Army during World War II, he played in Army shows such as The Army Play‐by‐Play and About Face, a touring show that featured Joe Louis.

Career 
In 1946 he joined the Broadway show Call Me Mister which dealt with the issues that servicemen encountered with return to civilian life. It ran to 734 performances.

In 1948 he moved from Broadway to film. He appeared in such Metro-Goldwyn-Mayer musicals as Easter Parade (1948), Take Me Out to the Ball Game (1949), On the Town (1949) and Silk Stockings (1957).

In August 1958 he appeared at the Aldwych Theatre in London's West End in a run of George Tabori's play Brouhaha with Peter Sellers in the lead role and also featuring Lionel Jeffries. One of the September shows was televised on the BBC. The show which was directed by Peter Hall ran until 28 February 1959.

Munshin died in New York City at the age of 54 from a heart attack, three days before his 55th birthday. He is buried in Long Island National Cemetery.

Filmography

References
8. "That Girl", (TV episodes, 1969), IMDB. https://m.imdb.com/title/tt0909779/

https://www.imdb.com/name/nm0613235/?ref_=ttfc_fc_cl_t108

External links

American male musical theatre actors
1915 births
1970 deaths
Burials at Long Island National Cemetery
Donaldson Award winners
Jewish American male actors
Jewish American comedians
20th-century American male actors
Metro-Goldwyn-Mayer contract players
20th-century American singers
20th-century American male singers
United States Army personnel of World War II
Jewish American male comedians
20th-century American Jews